Carpathonesticus spelaeus  is an araneomorph spider species of the family Nesticidae. It occurs in Romania, where it can be found in caves and outdoors under calcareous blocks. It was transferred from the genus Nesticus to Carpathonesticus in 1980 by Lehtinen and Saaristo.

Description
Prosoma length is 2.4 mm in male and female specimens. In females, the prosoma is pale yellowish with a very faint pattern; the sternum and appendages are a pale reddish yellow. The opisthosoma is very faintly patterned. The eyes are ringed with a light brownish shade.

Original publication

References 

Nesticidae
Spiders of Europe
Spiders described in 1917